Manoj Cheruparambil (born 24 October 1979) is an Indian-born Hong Kong cricketer.  He played in two One Day Internationals for the Hong Kong cricket team in 2004, both in Colombo in Sri Lanka during the Asia Cup, the first against Bangladesh and the second against Pakistan.  As of 1 March 2007, he has also played in two first-class and two List A cricket matches. He served as captain of Hong Kong in ICC World Cricket League matches and also as vice-captain. He also served as a wicket-keeper for Hong Kong national team.

References

External links

Hong Kong cricketers
Hong Kong One Day International cricketers
Indian emigrants to Hong Kong
1979 births
Living people
Cricketers from Thrissur
Malayali people
Cricketers from Kerala